During the Second World War, the Allies realised the need for the landing zone of an amphibious assault to be organised for the efficient passage of follow on forces. The British formed such units from all three services – the Royal Navy (Commandos), British Army and the Royal Air Force, with the Army component comprising Infantry, Engineers, Ordnance, Royal Electrical and Mechanical Engineers, Medical and Service Corps.

The equivalent U.S. units were called "beach battalions."

Formation
After the Operation Torch landings, the need for a beach organisation became apparent for the larger planned operations. Beach Groups were formed in the UK and began to train in Scotland. In the Mediterranean, the equivalent organisations were called Beach Bricks and were formed in Egypt and trained at Kabrit.
The Chief of Combined Operations Lord Louis Mountbatten described the functions of a beach group in late 1942:
 Arrange and control the movement of all personnel and vehicles from the landing craft to inland assembly areas.
 Move stores from ships' holds and craft to dumps in the beach maintenance areas.
 Develop and organise the beaches and beach maintenance area in regard to defence, movement and administration, including the evacuation of all casualties and recovery of vehicles.
 Provide the beach signal organisation.
 The removal to the UK of casualties, prisoners of war and salvaged equipment.
 The creation of dumps to hold petrol, ammunition and rations that were being landed.
 Assembly areas for the arriving personnel and their vehicles.
For this, a tri-service formation was created around an infantry battalion, added to this were smaller units from the Royal Engineers, Royal Army Medical Corps, Royal Electrical and Mechanical Engineers, Royal Army Ordnance Corps, Royal Pioneer Corps, Royal Army Service Corps and the Corps of Military Police. The Navy provided Royal Naval Beach Commandos and a signal unit, and the Royal Air Force provided for beach anti-aircraft defence. The complement of a Beach group or brick was up to 3,000 men.

The beach commandos were composed of 76 officers and men, led by the one Principal Beach Master and three Beach Masters, who would land with the assaulting troops and have the following duties:
 Marking the limits of the beachhead
 Set up a protected area for the beach commander to operate from
 Calling in landing craft to the beach via radio, signal lamp or loud-hailer.
 Unloading landing craft according to priority.
 Providing salvage parties to recover damaged landing craft, stores and equipment.
 Providing fire fighting parties, using modified DUKWs
 Ensuring personnel and equipment could move through the beachhead as quickly as possible
 Mooring landing craft correctly
Each commando, which was to control the landing area for a brigade, was subdivided into a headquarters and three sub units (Beach Parties), each controlling a battalion landing area. The men wore army battledress with navy headgear. Nine beach commandos were formed for Operation Overlord, designated F, J, L, P, Q, R, S, T and W, the latter was composed of Canadians.

The Royal Navy Beach Signals units were to provide communications between the beach and the offshore forces. Included in the units were men from the army and RAF.

The infantry component was intended to be a fighting force if any pockets of resistance remained on the beach immediately after the landings. After the beach had been secured, the battalion was to provide manpower for any other tasks, for example 6th Battalion Border Regiment was split up as follows,
 A and D Companies - beach companies
 B Company - a labour unit of the ammunition section of the beach ordnance detachment
 C Company - reserve
 S Company - (the Universal Carrier, mortar and anti-tank platoons), to provide labour for the petrol depot.

As well as the treatment and dispatch of casualties back to Britain, the Medical Corps was also tasked with the provision of drinking water for the troops.

The Military Police (MPs) were to be used to control the flow of traffic on the beach and to guard and document the prisoners of war collected in the initial stages and brought back to the beach. These units also included RAF MPs.

The pioneer companies were called on to perform many duties; construction of roads, air-fields and stores, mine clearance, collection and evacuation of wounded, collection and burial of the dead, transport, guarding POWs and, where necessary, fight.

The RASC was responsible for the transport and distribution of the supplies needed by the troops.

The REME was tasked with keeping the beaches clear of disabled vehicles, including the removal of stranded landing craft. Repairable vehicles were repaired in place or at a vehicle park. The men used normal and specialised recovery vehicles for the task, such as the BARV.

The precise mix and number of units depended of the perceived need of each location.

Training
From spring 1942, on the formation of the beach commandos, training was begun at the shore establishment HMS Armadillo Ardentinny, with amphibious training on Loch Long. RAF units and other formations destined for the beach groups were trained at Gailes Camp near Irvine, North Ayrshire.

Units formed in the Mediterranean trained at Kibrit on the Great Bitter Lake on the Suez Canal.

Beach Groups

No. 3 Beach Group
Formed in the UK, it sailed to Sicily with the 1st Canadian Infantry Division, landing on 10 July 1943. It contained the 68th RAF Beach Unit. Utilised again for the Salerno landings, and attached to the British 56th Infantry Division, landing on Rodger beach on 9 September 1943, for this operation it contained the 68th and 69th RAF Beach Units.

No.4 Beach Group
This unit also sailed with the 1st Canadian Infantry Division from Britain and landed with them during the invasion of Sicily. It contained the 69th RAF Beach Unit. It was the reserve Beach group for Juno.

No.5 Beach Group

Supported the 3rd Infantry Division on Sword, Queen beaches.

No.6 Beach Group
Reserve for Sword.

Composition

No.7 Beach Group
Supported the 3rd Canadian Infantry Division landed on Mike in the Juno landing area.

Composition

No.8 Beach Group
Landed on Nan, in the Juno landing area.

Composition

No.9 Beach Group

Supported the 50th (Northumbrian) Infantry Division landing on the King sector of the Gold, landing area.

Composition

No.10 Beach Group
Landed on the Jig beaches, within the Gold sector.

Composition

No. 20 Beach Group

This unit landed with the 51st (Highland) Infantry Division on Sicily on 10 July 1943. The infantry component was two companies of the 2/4th Hampshire Regiment.

No. 21 Beach Group
This unit also landed with the 51st (Highland) Infantry Division on Sicily on 10 July 1943.
The unit was used again and landed at Salerno on Sugar beach, supporting the 56th Infantry Division. It contained two companies of the Hampshire Regiment and the RAF's 81st and 82nd Auxiliary Embarkation Units.

No.31 Beach Brick
Formed on 13 April 1943 at Kabrit in Egypt, around the 7th Battalion Royal Marines. This unit was charged with training itself and then other units that were to form other Beach Bricks. It landed on Sicily supporting the 231st Infantry Brigade at Marzamemi.

No.32 Beach Brick
Formed around the 2nd Battalion Highland Light Infantry, the Brick supported the 5th Infantry Division during the Sicily landings at Cassibile (beaches Nos. 45 and 46) south of Syracuse. The Brick again supported the 5th Division (13th Infantry Brigade) in the landings at Calabria on 3 September 1943 on George Beach.

No.33 Beach Brick
Formed on 1 April 1943 around 1st Battalion Argyll and Sutherland Highlanders, the Brick supported the 17th Infantry Brigade of the 5th Infantry Division at George Beach (beach No. 44). On 27 July, the Highlanders were sent to the front line and the 1st Battalion Welch Regiment took their place from No. 34 Beach Brick. The Brick was reassembled with the Highlanders for the landings at Calabria, again with 17th Brigade, on How beach north of Torrente. The Brick was disbanded in November 1943.

No.34 Beach Brick
Formed on 1 June 1943 at Kabrit Egypt around the 1st Battalion, Welch Regiment, the Brick supported the 50th (Northumbrian) Infantry Division during the Sicily Landings at Avola. For the landings at Calabria, the Brick supported the 3rd Canadian Infantry Brigade on Fox beach north of Reggio de Calabria. The Brick supported the Anzio landings with D Company of 18th Durham Light Infantry as the infantry component. Denis Healey was a Beach Master for this operation.

No.35 Beach Brick
Formed around the 18th Battalion Durham Light Infantry at Kabrit, it transferred to Algeria in July for training and then to Tunisia for more training with the 46th Infantry Division, whom it supported in the landings at Salerno on Uncle beach.

No.36 Beach Brick
Formed on 20 July 1943 at Kabrit in Egypt around the dismounted men of 8th Royal Tank Regiment. The brick was sent to Palestine in August, around plans for capture of Rhodes in late 1943. This was cancelled and the Brick transferred to the UK in early 1944. By this time, 8th Royal Tank Regiment had left the Brick and been re-equipped with tanks; 18th Durham Light Infantry took their place. For the Normandy landings, the Brick was in reserve for Gold.

Composition (Normandy)

Awards
Men of the Beach Groups and Bricks received the following awards during their service. This list is incomplete.

During the Salerno landings, the Distinguished Service Order was awarded to Wing Commander Rowland George O.B.E., and the Military Cross was awarded to Major Cameron (18th Durham Light Infantry) and Flight Lieutenant John Dobbin, who organised the beaches and cleared vehicle congestion while under fire.

During the Normandy Landings, the following Beach Commandos of Nos 5 and 6 Beach Groups received Awards.

Members of the Royal Navy beach signals sections won the following.

On 8 June, a German fighter plane dropped a bomb on the petrol and ammunition depot on Sword, with the ensuing fire threatening to destroy large quantities of supplies. Men of 5 and 6 Beach Groups worked to save the supplies; seven of whom were awarded the George Medal.
 Lt.Col. R D R Sale (1 Bucks)
 Maj. L Pepper (RAOC)
 Lt. E Fairbrother (RE)
 Sgt H Grant (Pioneers)
 Sgt J S MacGowen (RAOC)
 Sgt A G Wakeford (RASC)
 Pte A Catley (Pioneers)

Australian Beach Groups
Two Australian beach groups were formed in June 1944, and saw action in the Borneo campaign in 1945.

1st Beach Group
Supported the 9th Division in the landings at Brunei and Labuan. It was commanded by Colonel C. J. Cummings. 

Composition

2nd Beach Group
Supported the 9th Division in the Battle of Tarakan and the 7th Division in the Battle of Balikpapan. It was commanded by Colonel C. R. Hodgson. 

Composition

See also
 Colin Maud

References

Bibliography
 
 

Amphibious warfare